Dan Ayala (April 29, 1937 – September 17, 2018) was an American college basketball coach. He was the women's basketball head coach at the University of Nevada, Las Vegas from 1975 to 1980.

He died on September 17, 2018, in Las Vegas, Nevada at age 81.

References

1937 births
2018 deaths
American men's basketball coaches
American women's basketball coaches
UNLV Runnin' Rebels basketball coaches
UNLV Lady Rebels basketball coaches